Cyclic GMP-AMP synthase is a protein that in humans is encoded by the CGAS gene.
It's an enzyme, a nucleotidyltransferase, a cyclic GMP-AMP synthase.

References

Further reading

External links 
 PDBe-KB provides an overview of all the structure information available in the PDB for Human Cyclic GMP-AMP synthase (MB21D1)

Human proteins